In Tibetan cuisine, Lunggoi Katsa is stewed sheep's head, with curry, fennel, monosodium glutamate and salt.

See also
 List of lamb dishes
 List of stews
 List of Tibetan dishes

References

Tibetan stews
Lamb dishes